Garrus Vakarian is a fictional character in BioWare's Mass Effect franchise.

Garrus or Garroos or Garus may also refer to:

Places in Iran
Historical name of Bijar County
Garrus, East Azerbaijan
Garus-e Olya, a village in Kermanshah Province, Iran
Garus-e Sofla, a village in Kermanshah Province, Iran
Garus, Kohgiluyeh and Boyer-Ahmad

Other uses
 Garus language